Telekom Malaysia Cycling Team is an Invitational Continental Team cycling team based in the Kuala Lumpur, Malaysia. The team are founded to participate in the Tour de Langkawi. Telekom Malaysia Cycling Team's most prominent riders are New Zealand's Graeme Miller, Hong Kong's Wong Kam-po, Indonesia's Tonton Susanto, Iran's Ghader Mizbani Iranagh and Malaysia's Nor Effandy Rosli and Mohamad Fauzi Shafihi.

The team's title sponsor is Telekom Malaysia, which is the largest telecommunication company in Malaysia and also Southeast Asia's second-largest telecommunication company.

Squad

Team achievements

Riders

Team

External links
 http://www.tm.com.my

UCI Continental Teams (Asia)
Cycling teams based in Malaysia
Cycling teams established in 2000